Mario Mocenni (22 January 1823—14 November 1904) was an Italian Cardinal of the Roman Catholic Church, who served both in the diplomatic service of the Holy See and in the Roman Curia, and was elevated to the cardinalate in 1893.

Biography
Born in Montefiascone, Mario Mocenni was ordained to the subdiaconate on 21 September 1844, the diaconate on 27 May 1845 and the priesthood on 20 December 1845. He was later made a Privy Chamberlain supernumerary of His Holiness, and auditor of nunciature to Austria.

On 24 July 1877 he was appointed Titular Archbishop of Heliopolis in Phoenicia by Pope Pius IX, receiving his episcopal consecration on the following 12 August from Cardinal Alessandro Franchi in Rome. Mocenni was later named Apostolic Delegate to Ecuador, Peru, Nueva Granada, Venezuela, Guatemala, Costa Rica, Honduras, and Nicaragua on 14 August that year. On 28 March 1882 he became Internuncio to the Empire of Brazil.

Seven months later, on 18 October 1882, Mocenni entered the service of the Roman Curia upon being appointed Substitute, or deputy, of the Vatican Secretariat of State. Pope Leo XIII created him Cardinal Priest of San Bartolomeo all'Isola in the consistory of 16 January 1893. He later opted to become a Cardinal Bishop, assuming the suburbicarian see of Sabina on 18 May 1894. As Cardinal Bishop of Sabina, he was also perpetual abbot of Farfa. Mocenni participated in the papal conclave of 1903, which selected Pope Pius X.

The Cardinal died in Rome, at age 81. After lying in state in the church of Santa Maria in Traspontina, he was buried in the chapel of the Sacred Congregation of Propaganda Fide in the Campo Verano cemetery.

References

Books
Jankowiak, François (2005), "La Curie romaine,"    in:

External links
Cardinals of the Holy Roman Church
Catholic-Hierarchy 

1823 births
1904 deaths
19th-century Italian cardinals
Cardinals created by Pope Leo XIII
Cardinal-bishops of Sabina
19th-century Italian Roman Catholic titular archbishops
Apostolic Delegates to Peru
Apostolic Nuncios to Costa Rica
20th-century Italian cardinals
People from the Province of Viterbo